Diadegma maurum is a wasp first described by Johann Ludwig Christian Gravenhorst in 1829. It is a member of the genus Diadegma and family Ichneumonidae. No subspecies are listed.

References 

maurum

Taxa named by Johann Ludwig Christian Gravenhorst
Insects described in 1829